Toba Batak may refer to:
The Toba Batak people of North Sumatra, Indonesia
The Toba Batak language